SB-243213 is a research chemical which acts as a selective inverse agonist for the 5HT2C receptor and has anxiolytic effects. It has better than 100x selectivity for 5-HT2C over all other receptor subtypes tested, and a longer duration of action compared to older 5-HT2C antagonist ligands.

See also 
 CEPC
 RS-102221
 SB-242084

References 

5-HT2C antagonists
Indolines
Ureas
Pyridines
Trifluoromethyl compounds